Van Wert County is a county located in the U.S. state of Ohio. As of the 2020 census, the population was 28,931. Its county seat is Van Wert. The county was created in February 12, 1820 and later organized on March 18, 1837. It is named for Isaac Van Wart, one of the captors of John André in the American Revolutionary War.

Van Wert County comprises the Van Wert, OH Micropolitan Statistical Area, which is included within the Lima-Van Wert-Celina, OH Combined Statistical Area.

Geography

Adjacent counties

 Paulding County (north)
 Putnam County (northeast)
 Allen County, Ohio (east)
 Auglaize County (southeast)
 Mercer County (south)
 Adams County, Indiana (southwest)
 Allen County, Indiana (northwest)

Demographics

2000 census
As of the 2000 census, there were 29,659 people, 11,587 households and 8,354 families living in the county. The population density was 72 people per square mile (28/km2). There were 12,363 housing units at an average density of 30 per square mile (12/km2). The racial makeup of the county was 97.43% White, 0.75% Black or African American, 0.11% Native American, 0.19% Asian, 0.75% from other races and 0.77% from two or more races. 1.56% of the population were Hispanic or Latino of any race.

There were 11,587 households, out of which 32.90% had children under the age of 18 living with them, 60.20% were married couples living together, 8.50% had a female householder with no husband present, and 27.90% were non-families. 24.70% of all households were made up of individuals, and 11.40% had someone living alone who was 65 years of age or older. The average household size was 2.52 and the average family size was 3.00.

In the county, the population was spread out, with 26.00% under the age of 18, 8.30% from 18 to 24, 27.30% from 25 to 44, 22.90% from 45 to 64, and 15.50% who were 65 years of age or older. The median age was 38 years. For every 100 females there were 95.50 males. For every 100 females age 18 and over, there were 92.40 males.

The median income for a household in the county was $39,497, and the median income for a family was $46,503. Males had a median income of $32,377 versus $23,859 for females. The per capita income for the county was $18,293. About 4.20% of families and 5.50% of the population were below the poverty line, including 5.80% of those under age 18 and 4.00% of those age 65 or over.

2010 census
As of the 2010 United States census, there were 28,744 people, 11,439 households and 7,921 families living in the county. The racial makeup of the county was 96.6% white, 0.9% black or African American, 0.2% Asian, 0.1% American Indian, 0.8% from other races, and 1.4% from two or more races. Those of Hispanic or Latino origin made up 2.6% of the population. In terms of ancestry, 43.6% were German, 12.4% were Irish, 11.5% were English and 11.0% were American.

Of the 11,439 households, 31.4% had children under the age of 18 living with them, 55.6% were married couples living together, 9.2% had a female householder with no husband present, 30.8% were non-families, and 26.6% of all households were made up of individuals. The average household size was 2.48 and the average family size was 2.98. The median age was 40.3 years.

The median income for a household in the county was $44,415 and the median income for a family was $51,215. Males had a median income of $37,408 versus $28,692 for females. The per capita income for the county was $20,772. About 6.1% of families and 8.8% of the population were below the poverty line, including 12.7% of those under age 18 and 6.6% of those age 65 or over.

Politics
Van Wert County is a stronghold Republican county in presidential elections. In 2020, Donald Trump nearly won 80% of the votes cast in the county.

|}

Government

Van Wert County has a 3-member Board of County Commissioners that administer and oversee the various County departments, similar to all but 2 of the 88 Ohio counties. The elected commissioners serve four-year terms. Van Wert County's three elected commissioners are: Thad Lichtensteiger (R), Stan Owens (R), and Todd Wolfrum (R).

Communities

Cities
 Delphos (part)
 Van Wert (county seat)

Villages

 Convoy
 Elgin
 Middle Point
 Ohio City
 Scott
 Venedocia
 Willshire
 Wren

Townships

 Harrison
 Hoaglin
 Jackson
 Jennings
 Liberty
 Pleasant
 Ridge
 Tully
 Union
 Washington
 Willshire
 York

https://web.archive.org/web/20160715023447/http://www.ohiotownships.org/township-websites

Unincorporated communities

 Abanaka
 Cavett
 Dixon‡
 Dull
 Glenmore
 Hoaglin
 Jonestown
 Middlebury
 Monticello
 Schumm
 Seamersville

See also
 National Register of Historic Places listings in Van Wert County, Ohio

References

External links
 County website
 The Van Wert County Economic Development Group
 Maumee Valley Heritage Corridor

 
1837 establishments in Ohio
Populated places established in 1837